Pam Curtis (née Horton; born May 4, 1955) is an American politician. She has served as a Democratic member for the 32nd district in the Kansas House of Representatives since 2014. She was appointed to this position after the death of the incumbent, and won re-election in November 2020 with 75% of the vote.

References

1955 births
Living people
Democratic Party members of the Kansas House of Representatives
21st-century American politicians
Women state legislators in Kansas
21st-century American women politicians
Politicians from Kansas City, Kansas